Stig Lindberg (25 November 1921 – 14 June 1994) was a Swedish speed skater. He competed in the men's 500 metres events at the 1952 Winter Olympics.

References

External links
 

1921 births
1994 deaths
Swedish male speed skaters
Olympic speed skaters of Sweden
Speed skaters at the 1952 Winter Olympics
People from Katrineholm Municipality
Sportspeople from Södermanland County
20th-century Swedish people